Sawtelle Boulevard is a north/south street in the Westside region of the city of Los Angeles, California.  For most of its length, it parallels the San Diego Freeway (Interstate 405), one block to the east.

The street has important Japanese American cultural and historical significance.

Route
Sawtelle Boulevard’s northern end is north of Dowlen Drive within the Los Angeles Veterans Administration complex (which it enters at Ohio Avenue), and its southern end is at Overland Avenue, a few blocks east of Sepulveda Boulevard. Sawtelle Boulevard is a major thoroughfare for the Sawtelle community and West Los Angeles neighborhood.

The portion of Sawtelle Boulevard from Santa Monica Boulevard to Olympic Boulevard is a trendy spot for the newer Japanese American community in Los Angeles,. Officially named Sawtelle Japantown, but often called simply Sawtelle or Little Osaka - not to be confused with downtown Los Angeles’ older, larger Little Tokyo, or Japantown, San Francisco, California, Sawtelle is relatively near UCLA, Santa Monica, and Culver City. As of 2012, businesses found on this street include Japanese fast food (curry and ramen), two Japanese supermarkets, upscale sushi bars, a holistic and medical office, hair salons, neighborhood Japanese grocery stores, a Boba tea shop, anime shops, Japanese artisan stores, temples, and a few historic nurseries. In recent years, the businesses have expanded to Korean and Chinese cuisines with popular restaurants including Seoul Tofu and ROC Kitchen. The neighborhood appeals to a wide demographic with cheap eat as well as upscale restaurants and a banquet center on the corner of Olympic Boulevard and Sawtelle Boulevard. One interesting site was the consulate of Saudi Arabia, prior to relocated to Wilshire Blvd location, being next to a ramen restaurant and an esoteric Japanese magazine store.

Homes south of this portion of Sawtelle Boulevard are inhabited by a large Japanese American population. Many of the homes exhibit gardens and landscapes true to Japanese tradition.

After passing Olympic Boulevard, Sawtelle Boulevard continues as a four-lane boulevard running parallel to the San Diego Freeway and Sepulveda Boulevard. After entering Culver City, Sawtelle Boulevard swerves east, crosses Sepulveda Boulevard and ends at Overland Avenue in Culver City.

See also
 Sawtelle, Los Angeles
 Little Tokyo
 Sawtelle Japantown Guide
 Map of Sawtelle Japantown, West Los Angeles

In popular culture
 In Robert A. Heinlein's The Door into Summer, the main character visits a cryogenics facility located on Sawtelle Boulevard.

References

External links 

Streets in Los Angeles
Streets in Los Angeles County, California
Culver City, California
Mar Vista, Los Angeles
Sawtelle, Los Angeles
West Los Angeles
Westside (Los Angeles County)
Japanese-American culture in Los Angeles